Aurangabad Assembly constituency may refer to the following constituencies in India:
 Aurangabad, Bihar Assembly constituency
 Aurangabad, West Bengal Assembly constituency, former assembly constituency in West Bengal

See also
 Aurangabad Central Assembly constituency, in Maharashtra
 Aurangabad West Assembly constituency, in Maharashtra
 Aurangabad East Assembly constituency, in Maharashtra